Limenarchis pullata is a moth in the family Gelechiidae. It was described by John David Bradley in 1961. It is found on Guadalcanal in the Solomon Islands.

References

Gelechiinae
Moths described in 1961